Özge Özberk (born 13 August 1976) is a Turkish actress who has acted in many films, television series and plays.

Biography
Özge Özberk was born in Istanbul, Turkey in 1976. Her brother is actor, Özgür Özberk. She studied theater at Istanbul University and Mujdat Gezen Arts Centre. 

She gained recognition with her role in the sci-fi comedy film, GORA. Her most recent roles are in the films 'Babam ve Oğlum' 'Mavi Gözlü Dev', '120' and series 'Geniş Zamanlar'. Her historical drama series are 'Kırık Kanatlar' and 'Çemberimde Gül Oya'. She played in many popular series and films.

As of 2013, she stars in teen comedy drama Pis Yedili.
In 2017, she started a new TV series "Kalbimdeki Deniz" as "Deniz"

Filmography

Movies

2012 - N'apcaz Şimdi?
2008 - A.R.O.G
2008 - 120
2007 - Mavi Gözlü Dev
2005 - Babam ve Oğlum
2004 - G.O.R.A.
2000 - Yıldız Tepe

TV series
2020 - Bir Annenin Günahı
2016 - Kalbimdeki Deniz
2011 - Pis Yedili
2011 - Canım Babam
2008 - Yol Arkadaşım
2008 - Sinekli Bakkal
2007 - Geniş Zamanlar
2005–2006 - Kırık Kanatlar
2004 - Çemberimde Gül Oya
2000 - Yıldız Tepe
1999 - Sır Dosyası
1997 - Bir Demet Tiyatro
1995 - Bizim Ev
1993 - Şaban Askerde
1989 - Bizimkiler

Short movies
2007 - Hakimiyet

References

External links
 

1976 births
Living people
Turkish film actresses
Turkish television actresses
20th-century Turkish actresses